Juan Edgardo Ramírez (born 25 May 1993) is an Argentine footballer who plays as a midfielder who currently plays for Boca Juniors.

Club career

Argentinos Juniors
Ramírez was born in Moreno, Buenos Aires. An Argentinos Juniors youth graduate, he made his professional debut on 21 May 2011, in a 0–1 loss against Olimpo, at the age of just 17.

Ramírez scored his first goal as a professional on 13 May 2012, in a 2–1 win against Racing Club.

Colorado Rapids
On 20 February 2015, Colorado Rapids confirmed that they had signed Ramírez to a young designated player contract.

On 24 August 2017, Colorado and Ramírez agreed to mutually terminate his contract at the club.

Almería (loan)
Ramírez signed on loan with Segunda División side UD Almería on 24 January 2016, reuniting with Néstor Gorosito, his former manager at Argentinos Juniors.

Talleres (loan)
On 8 August 2016, Ramírez joined Argentine Primera División club Talleres on loan.

Honours
Boca Juniors
Primera División: 2022
Copa Argentina: 2019–20
Copa de la Liga Profesional: 2022
Supercopa Argentina: 2022

References

External links

1993 births
Living people
Sportspeople from Buenos Aires Province
Argentine footballers
Association football midfielders
Argentine Primera División players
Argentinos Juniors footballers
Designated Players (MLS)
Major League Soccer players
Colorado Rapids players
Segunda División players
UD Almería players
Talleres de Córdoba footballers
San Lorenzo de Almagro footballers
Argentine expatriate footballers
Argentine expatriate sportspeople in the United States
Argentine expatriate sportspeople in Spain
Expatriate soccer players in the United States
Expatriate footballers in Spain